Lyonia maestrensis is a species of plant in the family Ericaceae. It is endemic to Cuba.

References

Flora of Cuba
maestrensis
Endangered plants
Taxonomy articles created by Polbot